The 1949 Lausanne Grand Prix was a non-championship Formula One motor race held in Lausanne on 28 August 1949. The race was held over 90 laps and was won from pole position by Giuseppe Farina in a Maserati 4CLT/48. Alberto Ascari in a Ferrari 125 was second and Emmanuel de Graffenried in another Maserati was third.

Classification

Race

References

Lausanne Grand Prix